Gul Lasht Zom is a snowy pinnacle easily visible from any vantage point on the Tirich Glacier from the Shagroom side. It lies in the Hindu Raj range of Pakistan. It offers easy climbing and was first climbed by Kurt Diemberger of Austria.

See also
 Hindu Raj
 Hindu Kush
 List of mountains in Pakistan

External links
 Northern Pakistan detailed placemarks in Google Earth 

Mountains of Khyber Pakhtunkhwa
Six-thousanders of the Hindu Raj